Martha was constructed in Sydney in 1799.  She was a sealer and merchant vessel that was wrecked at Little Manly Cove in Australia in August 1800 with the loss of her crew of four. Her master was William Reid (or Reed). She arrived at Port Jackson on 14 December from Bass Strait. She was carrying 1,000 to 1,300 seal skins and 30 tierces of seal oil. She then left again on 6 March 1800.

On the voyage that proved her undoing, Martha was wrecked with a load of coal on her way from Reid's Mistake to Sydney.

Citations and references
Citations

References
 
 

Shipwrecks of the Sydney Eastern Suburbs Region
1799 ships
Maritime incidents in 1800
1800 in Australia
1788–1850 ships of Australia
Merchant ships of Australia
Schooners of Australia
Manly, New South Wales
Sealing ships
Ships built in New South Wales